The Law of Enclosures is a 2000 Canadian drama film. It was written and directed by John Greyson, and based on the novel The Law of Enclosures by Dale Peck.

The story traces the marital relationship of Henry and Beatrice, characters based on Peck's real-life parents, over the course of their lives from their courtship as young adults to their 40th wedding anniversary. For the film adaptation, Greyson set the events in 1991 against the backdrop of the first Gulf War, with Henry and Beatrice's younger and older selves all coexisting in a single time frame.

Sarah Polley and Brendan Fletcher play Beatrice and Henry as a young couple, with Diane Ladd and Sean McCann playing the older characters. While author Peck was born in New York and raised in Kansas, Greyson set the film in Sarnia, Ontario. The score was written by Don Pyle and Andrew Zealley.

Cast
Sarah Polley as Beatrice
Brendan Fletcher as Henry
Diane Ladd as Bea
Sean McCann as Hank
Kristen Thomson as Myrah
Rob Stefaniuk as Stanley
Shirley Douglas as Myra
Victor Cowie as Stan
Sharon Bajer as Doctor
Darcy Fehr as Young Miller

Award
Brendan Fletcher won Best Performance by an Actor in a Leading Role at the 22nd Genie Awards.

External links
 
 
 
 

2000 films
English-language Canadian films
Canadian drama films
Films based on American novels
Films directed by John Greyson
2000s English-language films
2000s Canadian films